Dudswell is a municipality of 1,600 people in Le Haut-Saint-François Regional County Municipality, in Quebec, Canada.

References

Notable residents
 Ralph Gustafson (1909-1995), poet and professor of literature at Bishop's University
 Eva Tanguay (1878-1947), singer, comedienne, vaudevillian and early example of 20th century celebrity culture
 Robert Atkinson Davis 4th premier of Manitoba.

External links

Municipalities in Quebec
Incorporated places in Estrie
Le Haut-Saint-François Regional County Municipality